María Romano (born 28 November 1931) is an Argentine fencer. She competed in the women's individual foil event at the 1964 Summer Olympics.

References

1931 births
Living people
Argentine female foil fencers
Olympic fencers of Argentina
Fencers at the 1964 Summer Olympics